Robert Wolfe (born November 24, 1946) is an American football coach.  He served as the head coach at Allegheny College (1984–1985), Tiffin University (1990–1997), and Hiram College (2007–2009), compiling a career college football record of 46–88–3.

Coaching career
Wolfe was the head  football coach at Allegheny College in Meadville, Pennsylvania for two season, from 1984 to 1985, compiling a record of 6–14.

Head coaching record

College

References

External links
 John Carroll profile
 Trine profile

1946 births
Living people
Allegheny Gators football coaches
Austin Peay Governors football coaches
Bowling Green Falcons football coaches
Cincinnati Bearcats football coaches
Hiram Terriers football coaches
John Carroll Blue Streaks football coaches
Tiffin Dragons football coaches
Trine Thunder football coaches
Youngstown State Penguins football coaches
High school football coaches in Ohio
Ball State University alumni
Bowling Green State University alumni
Hiram College faculty
People from Upper Sandusky, Ohio